The Ikva is a river in Ukraine and a right tributary of the Styr River that flows through Lviv Oblast, Ternopil Oblast and Rivne Oblast in the Volhynian Upland.

The river has at least one water reservoir near Mlyniv. Among its main tributaries is the Tartatska (right). The city of Dubno is located on the Ikva.

References

Rivers of Rivne Oblast
Rivers of Lviv Oblast
Rivers of Ternopil Oblast